Dominic Panganiban (born 27 September 1990), better known online as Domics, is a Filipino-born Canadian YouTuber, animator, and cartoonist.

Panganiban generally posts story-time animations in which he tells stories about his life, an aspect of it, or his thoughts. , Panganiban's YouTube channel has over 7.39 million subscribers and 1.19 billion views. His videos have been featured on multiple websites, including NewNowNext, the Malay Mail Online, and CBS News' website. In November 2014, he joined the multi-channel YouTube network Channel Frederator Network. Prior to doing so, he had been working for a similar YouTube network known as Fullscreen. In July 2015, he told USA Today that compared to Fullscreen, "Frederator was a better fit, because they cater more towards animation channels." Panganiban originally drew online comics, hence his screen name "Domics", a combination of "Dominic" and "comics." He discontinued this to create YouTube videos full-time. In 2018, Panganiban opened a board game café in Mississauga called "Domics' GG Gaming Café". However, the café was shut down in October 2020. It was located at the Heartland Town Centre. In March 2022, the café reopened at 900 Rathburn Road West in Mississauga.

Personal life 
According to one of his videos, he is related to Lani Misalucha, a popular singer in the Philippines. It was also mentioned in the video that he was 65% East/Southeast Asian (with a Japanese Great Grandmother  from his mother's father's side), and part Polynesian.

Career 
In July 2010 Panganiban started a web comic, to be posted on Tumblr. This would later be called Domics, as his brand. He then created his main YouTube channel, Domics, in August 2012, shortly after graduating from Ryerson University with an architecture degree. By this time, he had accumulated over 100,000 followers on his Tumblr account.

The next day Panganiban posted his first YouTube video titled: "Domics: Rural" which set the tone for his channel. On his fourth video, titled "Domics: Relationship Status", he used a vlog format inspired by Swoozie. He would use this style for the majority of his following content. Since creating his YouTube channel, Panganiban has gained 7.39 million subscribers and 1.1 billion views. His most popular video, "Crushes", (published on September 26, 2016) has 30.5 million views as of April 2021. He releases about one video every month, most accumulating over a million views. Panganiban's animations typically consist of him talking about either specific experiences in his life or more general topics. The animations are also usually monochromatic, although in recent years he has used color in a majority of the animations.

References

External links 
 
 
 
 
 

1990 births
Living people
Canadian animators
Canadian YouTubers
Filipino emigrants to Canada
Filipino animators
Filipino YouTubers
People from Manila
Toronto Metropolitan University alumni
YouTube animators
YouTube channels launched in 2012